Mohammed Rafi (born 24 May 1982, Trikaripur, Kasargod) is an Indian former professional footballer who last played for Kerala Blasters as a striker in Indian Super League.

Club
Mohammed Rafi came through the ranks of SBT which had distinction of fielding not only all-Indian but also all-Malayali squad. SBT was promoted to first division of National Football League in 2004 and in that season he scored 4 goals and came into limelight. Unfortunately, SBT got relegated but he was roped in by Mahindra United for the next season.

In 09-10 I-league, he finished the season with record 14 goals, which is best ever for an Indian striker, he was also adjudged Mahindra United's player of the year.

Rafi's example was followed by his younger brothers Mohammad Shafi, who played for Viva Kerala FC and Mohammad Razi, with KSEB.

Mumbai
On 24 November 2013 it was announced that Rafi has signed for Mumbai on loan from IMG Reliance with three other players Khelemba Singh, N.P. Pradeep and Peter Costa.
He made his debut on 2 December 2013 against East Bengal F.C. at the Balewadi Sports Complex in which he played the whole match as Mumbai won the match 3-2.

DSK Shivajians
After having a good season with Kerala Blasters in the 2015 Indian Super League season, Rafi joined DSK Shivajians, which gained a place in the league through bidding a direct entry slot, for the 2015-16 I-League season.

Indian Super League
Rafi played for Atletico de Kolkata in the inaugural season. The team owned by Sourav Ganguly and Atletico de Madrid in Indian Super League (ISL).

Rafi was signed by Kerala Blasters FC for the second season of Indian Super League. He scored on his debut, the second goal of the match against North East United and also set up Sanchez Watt's goal.

He won ISL Emerging Player of the Match award against NorthEast United FC in 2015 Indian Super League.

He was again signed by Kerala Blasters FC for the Third Season of Indian Super League (ISL), which is expected to kick start on 1 October 2016.

Mohammed Rafi became the third Indian to score a goal in the ISL final 2016, following Mohammed Rafique for Atletico de Kolkata in 2014, and Thongkhosiem Haokip for FC Goa in 2015.

In ISL 2017 rafi is playing for Chennaiyin FC(ISL 2015 champions). He scored goal in his first match against North East united on 23 November 2017.
In the 2018-19 season, he played 8 games for Chennaiyin without scoring a league goal. He also played 6 games and scored 3 goals in the AFC Cup.

In the 2019-20 season, he rejoined Kerala Blasters. On 4 October 2020, the club officially announced the departure of the veteran from the club.

International
Rafi also represented India number of times and scored a goal against Kuwait but India lost that match 1-9.

International goals

Honours

Club
Atlético de Kolkata
Indian Super League winner: 2014
Kerala Blasters
Indian Super League runner-up: 2016
Chennaiyin FC
 Indian Super League winner: 2017-18

Individual
 2009–10 I-League Player of The Year.

References

External links
 Mohammed Rafi at Goal.com
 
Indian Super League profile

1982 births
Living people
Indian footballers
Footballers from Kerala
Malayali people
Mappilas
Indian Muslims
Churchill Brothers FC Goa players
2011 AFC Asian Cup players
I-League players
Mumbai Tigers FC players
Mumbai FC players
Indian Super League players
India international footballers
ATK (football club) players
Kerala Blasters FC players
Association football forwards
People from Kasaragod district